Luz Elena Ruiz Bejarano (born November 30, 1936), more commonly known by her stage name Lucha Villa, is a Mexican singer and actress.

Early life
Born in Camargo, Chihuahua, Luz Elena Ruiz Bejarano was given her pseudonym "Lucha Villa" by television producer Luis G. Dillon ("Lucha" a hypocorism for Luz Elena, and "Villa" in honor of Pancho Villa).  She has been a constant presence in popular music and film since the early 1960s. Villa's early hits included "Media vuelta", by José Alfredo Jiménez, as well as "La cruz del cielo" and "Viva quien sabe querer"

In the 1970s, Lucha Villa traveled to Denver, Colorado to perform for a benefit for the Crusade for Justice, youth programs and school.

In 1996, Villa, along with Lola Beltrán and Amalia Mendoza, recorded the studio album, Disco del Siglo:  Las Tres Señoras, produced by Juan Gabriel, acknowledging their lasting contributions to music fanatics throughout Mexico and Latin America.

Acting career
She appeared in several films during the 1950s and early 1960s, received her first starring role in El gallo de oro (1964), and starred in Me cansé de rogarle, a musical with Jiménez and recording star Marco Antonio Muñiz.   She has appeared in some fifty films and won an Ariel Award for Best Actress (the Mexican equivalent of the Oscar) for Mecánica nacional (1973).

Personal life

She fell into a coma because of complications during surgery in August 1997, but recovered after a long stay in hospital, and has appeared on television sporadically since then. She was married 5 times; to Mario Miller 1951–1958 with whom she had two children, Rosa Elena b. 1953-Carlos Alberto b.

Selected filmography
 The Empire of Dracula (1967)
 National Mechanics (1972)

References

External links 
 Discography

 Filmography

Interviews
Val De La O Interviews Lucha Villa 

Mexican film actresses
1936 births
Living people
Ranchera singers
Ariel Award winners
Actresses from Chihuahua (state)
Singers from Chihuahua (state)
People from Camargo, Chihuahua
20th-century Mexican actresses
21st-century Mexican actresses
20th-century Mexican women singers
21st-century Mexican women singers